The Banggai language is the main language spoken by the inhabitants of the Banggai Archipelago off the island of Sulawesi. It belongs to the Saluan–Banggai branch of the Celebic subgroup.

References

Links

 Moseley, Christopher and E. R. Asher, ed. Atlas of the World's Languages (New York: Routelege, 1994) p. 122

Saluan–Banggai languages
Languages of Sulawesi